Yvonne Spigt (born 20 January 1988) is a Dutch marathon skater and inline skater. Spigt works as a doctor's assistant in her everyday non-sports life. Spigt's sisters Moniek, Petra, and Jannitta have also been skating in the women's marathon platoon. Spigt won the Dutch Open championships marathon skating on natural ice at the Weissensee on 30 January 2008. Spight later also won the Open Dutch Championship marathon skating on natural ice at the Grote Rietplas in Emmen on 8 February 2012.

Yvonne Spigt has been skating marathons in the Dutch Top Division since 2007. Spigt has been successively hatched for teams Foekens (2007-2009), Viks Parket (2009-2011), Beteropenhaardhout.nl (BOHH) (2011-2012), and Steigerplank.com (2012–present).

References 

1988 births
Living people
Dutch female speed skaters
Dutch roller skaters
People from Wervershoof
Sportspeople from North Holland
21st-century Dutch women